The 1979 Campeonato Carioca had two editions.

Special Championship

The first edition was the first championship organized by the recently founded FFERJ. It would include ten clubs; the six best teams of the 1978 City qualification and the four best teams of the 1978 State qualification. The championship would actually count for the 1978 season, and would be played in a double round-robin system. However, little less than two weeks before the beginning of the championship, the qualifications were acknowledged as the official Fluminense and Carioca championships of that year, and what would be the 1978 championship was turned into a "Special Championship" for 1979. Flamengo won its 19th title.

Championship

The championship began on May 5, 1979 and ended on November 4, 1979, and was disputed by the twelve teams of the 1978 Campeonato Carioca and the six teams of the 1978 Campeonato Fluminense. Flamengo won its 20th title.

System
The tournament would be divided in four stages:
 Taça Guanabara: The eighteen teams all played in a single round-robin format against each other. The champions earned a bonus point for the Third round; the ten best teams went to the Taça Inocêncio Pereira Leal and the eight worst went to the Taça Orlando Leal Carneiro.
 Taça Inocêncio Pereira Leal: The ten teams all played in a single round-robin format against each other. The champions earned a bonus point for the Third round. The six best teams qualified to the Third round.
 Taça Orlando Leal Carneiro: The eight teams all played in a single round-robin format against each other. The two best teams qualified to the Third round.
 Third round: The eight teams all played in a single round-robin format against each other. The team with the most points won the title.

Taça Guanabara

Taça Inocêncio Pereira Leal

Taça Orlando Leal Carneiro

Third round

References

Campeonato Carioca seasons
Carioca